Dauer (German for duration) may refer to:

 Jochen Dauer, a former German race car driver, leather magnate, and proprietor of Dauer Sportwagen GmbH, notable for converting Porsche 962 race cars for use on the road as Dauer 962 Le Mans
 Dauer larva